Bettina Werner (born in 1965, in Milan, Italy) is an Italian artist based in New York City. She has created artwork with her colorized salt technique since the early 1980s. Werner became an American citizen in July 2010 and now bears dual citizenship.

Life and work
Werner was born in Milan where studied at the Academy of Fine Arts of Brera. In 1989 she relocated to New York.

Salt's crystallized texture intrigued Werner and encouraged her to explore different combinations of textures and colors creating a unique and signature artistic language. Her first exhibition in New York was at the Marisa Del Re Gallery in 1990.

Her salt paintings, sculptures, art installations and functional pieces of artwork, such as her salt sculpture-table, salt sculpture-bed and salt sculpture-backgammon boards are exhibited in museums and galleries extensively throughout Europe, Russia and the United States, including the Whitney Museum, the Pushkin Museum in Moscow, the Detroit Institute of Art, Las Vegas Art Museum, Chase Manhattan Bank, the collection of Herbert and Dorothy Vogel, and the collection of Martin Margulies in Miami.

In 2002, she founded The Salt Queen Foundation in New York, a non-profit educational institution. Its goals include the celebration of artists who use innovative techniques and unusual materials. The institution is dedicated to the support, conservation, and protection of works of art created with Werner's unique textured and colorized salt technique invented in the 1980s. Furthermore, the foundation aims to promote the education of the value and importance of salt in the history of humanity and as a new art form, as well as to encourage the values utilized by other innovative artists working with different and extraordinary media.

Reviews and features on her work have appeared in The New York Times, The Wall Street Journal, and the New York Post, to name a few.

Books
Bettina Werner: Queen of Salt. Milan, Leonardo Arte, 1999.

Periodicals
VV. AA. (1993): "An Exhibition of Work by Contemporary Italian Artists", Frederick R. Weisman Museum of Art Magazine
Gianluca Bauzano,  (2000) "Bettina, The Manhattan Queen of Salt", Audry Magazine
Gianluca Bauzano, (1998) "Artisti Italiani a New York", Amica Magazine
Elisa Turner, (1991) "New Paintings by Bettina Werner", The Miami Herald
Marta Citacov, (1996) "Bettina Werner, Toccare con mano", L'Uomo Vogue
Francesca Bonazzoli, (1996) "Cristalli di sale nei colori di Bettina Werner", Corriere della Sera
Giorgio Bonomi, (1998) "Spazio, colore, superficie nella pittura di Bettina Werner", Arte in Umbria 
Eleonora Attolico, (1998) "Americana per abilita' straordinarie", Soprattutto 
Eleonora Attolico, (1999) "Tibino, la mia musa fedele", L'Espresso 
Gina Avogadro, (1990) "Andiamo in barca al Museo", Il Giorno 
Irene Silverman, (2003) "Bettina Werner: The Queen of Salt", The East Hampton Star
Antonio Carlucci, (2000) "Regina in mostra", L'Espresso Magazine
Marta Citacov, (2003) "Se il padrone e' un divo", GQ
Luisella Seveso, (2008) "Bettina, la Regina del Sale ha conquistato New York", Il Giorno
Achille Bonito Oliva, (1991) "Bettina Werner at Marisa del Re Gallery New York", Flash Art, no.161
Maria Balliana (1989) "Bettina Werner, il sale dell'arte", Italia Oggi

References

External links 
Bettina-werner.com
The Salt Queen Foundation
I quadri di sale di Bettina Werner
A Saline Mind, The Movement of Bettina Werner by Einstein
Bettina Werner/ Herbert and Dorothy Vogel Collection
Portrait of the Artist''s Muse: For Italian-born artist Bettina Werner, inspiration is always spot-on thanks to her beloved Dalmatian TIBINO 
Bettina Werner e TIBINO. Chi sono? interview
The Wall Street Journal PALACE OF THE SALT QUEEN by Sara Lin
BETTINA WERNER - THE QUEEN OF SALT interview
Bettina Werner - Art Exhibition at TIFFANY & Co.
Werner ('The SALT Queen') To Exhibit At 7 World Trade Center
Cristalli di sale nei colori di BETTINA WERNER. Al 49esimo piano del 7 World Trade Center una retrospettiva che celebra 25 anni di creazioni della "Queen of Salt"
Lower Manhattan/ A Tea with Bettina Werner
Lower Manhattan/ un te' con Bettina Werner
Il Tributo della REGINA DEL SALE per l'11 settembre
Bettina Werner, The Salt Queen amazing women rock
 Interview with Bettina Werner
Interview with Bettina Werner on Patrick McMullan's PMc Magazine
LA VOCE DI NEW YORK: Bettina Werner
 Bettina Werner, Regina "dell’oro bianco" a Venezia
Bettina Werner presents her newest salt crystal art collection to empower women in the eloquent Wall Street Down Town Association Club
Il sale della vita, il sale dell'arte. La mostra di Bettina Werner al Down Town Association Club
BETTINA WERNER, l'arte che brilla come "oro bianco"

1965 births
Artists from New York (state)
Living people
Artists from Milan
Italian contemporary artists
20th-century Italian women artists
21st-century Italian women artists
Brera Academy alumni
20th-century Italian painters
21st-century Italian painters
20th-century American women artists
21st-century American women artists
Italian emigrants to the United States
People with acquired American citizenship